William Henry Heard (born 1935 in Michigan) is a malacologist, and an authority on freshwater mollusks, especially freshwater pelecypods (clams). He is an emeritus professor in the Department of Biological Sciences, at Florida State University.

Heard was the winner of the  "Lifetime Achievement Award" for 2001 from the Freshwater Mollusk Conservation Society. He has had two species of mayflies named in his honor: Symbiocloeon heardi Müller-Liebenau and Povilla heardi Hubbard. Heard discovered these insects in Thailand, where they were living within the shells of freshwater clams.

Selected publications
 Comparative life histories of North American pill clams (Sphaeriidae: Pisidium). 1965. Malacologia, 2: 381-411
 Recent Eupera (Pelecypoda; Sphaeriidae) in the United States. 1965. Amer. Midland Nat. 74(2): 309-317
 A re-evaluation of the recent Unionacea (Pelecypoda) of North America. Malacologia, 10(2): 333-355 (with R. H. Guckert)
 Anatomical systematics of freshwater mussels. 1974. Malacol. Rev., 7: 41-42
 Reproduction of fingernail clams (Sphaeriidae: Sphaerium and Musculium). 1977. Malacologia, 16: 421-455
 Identification Manual of the Freshwater Clams of Florida. 1979. Fla. Dept. Environmental Regulation, Technical Series 4(2): 1-83. (available for download: PDF)
 Bivalvia I''. 1998. 145pp. Soc. Experimental and Descriptive Malacology. (editor, with John B. Burch)

References

Living people
Scientists from Michigan
21st-century American biologists
21st-century American zoologists
American malacologists
Florida State University faculty
Year of birth uncertain
1935 births